DVVL is an acronym for Discrete variable valve lift, a mechanical component of which two types exist:
 DVVLd, includes dual cam phasing.
 DVVLi, includes intake valve cam phasing.

Valvetrain